The Kingdom of the Netherlands, commonly known as simply the Netherlands, is a sovereign state and constitutional monarchy with 98% of its territory and population in Western Europe and with several small West Indian island territories in the Caribbean (in the Leeward Islands and Leeward Antilles groups).

The four parts of the Kingdom—Aruba, Curaçao, the Netherlands and Sint Maarten—are constituent countries (landen in Dutch; singular: land) and participate on a basis of equality as partners in the Kingdom. In practice, however, most of the Kingdom's affairs are administered by the Netherlands—which comprises roughly 98% of the Kingdom's land area and population—on behalf of the entire Kingdom. Consequently, Aruba, Curaçao and Sint Maarten are dependent on the Netherlands for matters like foreign policy and defence, but are autonomous to a certain degree, with their own parliaments.

The vast majority of land area of the constituent country of the Netherlands is in Europe, while its three special municipalities (Bonaire, Sint Eustatius and Saba) are located in the Caribbean, as are the other three constituent countries. The kingdom has a population of 17,737,438 .

History 

The Kingdom of the Netherlands originated in the aftermath of French Emperor Napoleon I's defeat in 1815. In that year the Netherlands regained its independence from France under its First French Empire, which had annexed its northern neighbour in 1810, as the Sovereign Principality of the United Netherlands. The great powers of Europe, united against Napoleonic France, had decided in the secret treaty of the London Protocol to establish a single state in the territories that were previously the Dutch Republic/Batavian Republic/Kingdom of Holland, the Austrian Netherlands and the Prince-Bishopric of Liège, awarding rule over this to William, Prince of Orange and Nassau, although the southern territories remained under Prussian (German) rule until Napoleon's return from his first exile on Elba ("Hundred Days").

In March 1815, amidst the turmoil of the Hundred Days, the Sovereign Prince William of Orange and Nassau adopted the style of "King of the Netherlands". Following Napoleon's second defeat at the Battle of Waterloo in June 1815, the Vienna Congress supplied international recognition of William's unilateral move. The new King of the Netherlands was also made Grand Duke of Luxembourg, a part of the Kingdom that was, at the same time, a member state of the German Confederation.

Belgium and Luxembourg independence 
In 1830, Belgium seceded from the Kingdom, a step that was recognised by the Netherlands only in 1839 in the Treaty of London.  At that point, Luxembourg became a fully independent country in a personal union with the Netherlands. Luxembourg also lost more than half of its territory to Belgium.  To compensate the German Confederation for that loss, the remainder of the Dutch province of Limburg received the same status that Luxembourg had enjoyed before, as a Dutch province that at the same time formed a Duchy of the German Confederation.  That status was reversed when the German Confederation ceased to exist in 1867, when Limburg became an ordinary Dutch province.

Decolonisation 
The Netherlands did not abolish slavery in its colonies until 1863.

The Kingdom's 1954 administrative reform was sparked by the 1931 Statute of Westminster and the 1941 Atlantic Charter (stating ″the right of all peoples to choose the form of government under which they will live, and the desire for a permanent system of general security″), which was signed by the Netherlands on 1 January 1942. Changes were proposed in the 7 December 1942 radio speech by Queen Wilhelmina. In this speech, the Queen, on behalf of the Dutch government in exile in London, expressed a desire to review the relations between the Netherlands and its colonies after the end of the war. After liberation, the government would call a conference to agree on a settlement in which the overseas territories could participate in the administration of the Kingdom on the basis of equality. Initially, this speech had propaganda purposes; the Dutch government had the Dutch East Indies (now Indonesia) in mind, and hoped to appease public opinion in the United States, which had become skeptical towards colonialism.

With Indonesia's independence, a federal constitution was considered too heavy as the economies of Suriname and the Netherlands Antilles were insignificant compared to that of the Netherlands. By the Charter for the Kingdom of the Netherlands, as enacted in 1954, a composite state was created (also known as the "Tripartite Kingdom of the Netherlands"), consisting of the Netherlands (mainland), Suriname and the Netherlands Antilles. Under the provisions of the Charter, both former colonies were granted internal autonomy. Suriname and the Netherlands Antilles each got a Minister Plenipotentiary based in the Netherlands, who had the right to participate in Dutch cabinet meetings that discussed affairs of the Kingdom as a whole when they pertained directly to Suriname or the Netherlands Antilles. Delegates of Suriname and the Netherlands Antilles could participate in sessions of the First and Second Chamber of the States General. An overseas member could be added to the Council of State when appropriate. According to the Charter, Suriname and the Netherlands Antilles could each alter its "Basic Law". The right of the two autonomous countries to leave the Kingdom, unilaterally, was not recognised; yet it also stipulated that the Charter could be dissolved by mutual consultation.

Before the Charter for the Kingdom of the Netherlands was proclaimed in 1954, Suriname, Netherlands New Guinea, and the Netherlands Antilles, (formerly, "Colony of Curaçao and subordinates") were colonies of the Netherlands.

Suriname was a constituent country within the Kingdom from 1954 to 1975, while the Netherlands Antilles was a constituent country from 1954 until 2010. Suriname has since become an independent republic, and the Netherlands Antilles was divided into six. Three are constituent countries: Aruba (since 1986), Curaçao and Sint Maarten (since 2010); three are special municipalities of the Netherlands proper: Bonaire, Sint Eustatius and Saba. Netherlands New Guinea was a dependent territory of the Kingdom until 1962, followed by seven-month transitional period when it was annexed by Indonesia. It was not an autonomous country, and was not mentioned in the Charter.

In 1955, Queen Juliana and Prince Bernhard visited Suriname and the Netherlands Antilles. The visit was a great success. The royal couple were welcomed enthusiastically by the local population, and the trip was widely reported in the Dutch press. Several other royal visits were to follow.

In 1969, an unorganised strike on the Antillean island of Curaçao resulted in serious disturbances and looting, during which a part of the historic city centre of Willemstad was destroyed by fire. Order was restored by Dutch marines. In the same year, Suriname saw serious political instability with the Surinamese prime minister, Jopie Pengel, threatening to request military support to break a teachers' strike.

In 1973, a new Dutch cabinet under Labour leader Joop den Uyl assumed power. In the government policy statement, the cabinet declared a wish to determine a date for the independence of Suriname and the Netherlands Antilles with the governments of those nations. The Antillean government was non-committal; the same held for the Surinamese Sedney cabinet (1969–1973). Suriname's 1973 elections brought the National Party Combination (Nationale Partij Kombinatie) to power, with Henck Arron as prime minister. The new government declared that Suriname would be independent before 1976. This was remarkable, as independence had not been an issue during the election campaign. The Den Uyl government in The Hague now had a willing partner in Paramaribo to realise its plans for Surinamese independence. Despite vehement and emotional resistance by the Surinamese opposition, Den Uyl and Arron reached an agreement, and, on 25 November 1975, Suriname became independent.

In January 1986, Aruba seceded from the Netherlands Antilles, becoming a constituent country of the Kingdom in its own right. In October 2010, the Netherlands Antilles was dissolved and Curaçao and Sint Maarten became the newest constituent countries of the Kingdom of the Netherlands.

Modern events 
The Kingdom celebrated its bicentennial in a series of festive occasions spanning from 2013 to 2015, the last being the year of the actual 200th anniversary of the Kingdom.

Constituent countries 
The Kingdom of the Netherlands consists of four constituent countries: the Netherlands, Aruba, Curaçao, and Sint Maarten. There is a difference between the Kingdom of the Netherlands and the Netherlands: the Kingdom of the Netherlands is the comprehensive sovereign state, while the Netherlands is one of its four constituent countries. Three Caribbean islands (Aruba, Curaçao, and Sint Maarten) are the three remaining constituent countries. Three other Caribbean islands (Bonaire, Sint Eustatius, and Saba) are special municipalities within the country of the Netherlands. Until its dissolution in 2010, the islands had formed the Netherlands Antilles, with the exception of Aruba, which left the grouping in 1986.

Comparison table

Netherlands 

The Netherlands is a representative parliamentary democracy organised as a unitary state. Its administration consists of the Monarch and the Council of Ministers, which is headed by a Prime Minister (currently Mark Rutte). The people are represented by the States General of the Netherlands, which consists of a House of Representatives and a Senate. The Netherlands is divided into 12 provinces: Drenthe, Flevoland, Friesland, Gelderland, Groningen, Limburg, North Brabant, North Holland, Overijssel, South Holland, Utrecht and Zeeland. The provinces are divided into municipalities. The Netherlands has the euro as its currency, except in the special municipalities of the Caribbean Netherlands (BES islands), where the Netherlands Antillean guilder was replaced by the U.S. dollar in 2011.

Bonaire, Sint Eustatius, and Saba 
The special municipalities of Bonaire, Sint Eustatius, and Saba (referred to as Caribbean Netherlands or BES islands) are part of the Netherlands proper but are not part of any province. They resemble ordinary Dutch municipalities in most ways (with a mayor, aldermen, and a municipal council, for example) and are subject to the ordinary Dutch legislative process. Residents of these three islands are also able to vote in Dutch national and European elections. There are, however, some derogations for these islands. Social security, for example, is not on the same level as it is in the Netherlands proper. In November 2008 it was decided to introduce the U.S. dollar in the three islands. The date of introduction was 1 January 2011. The Netherlands carries the risk of exchange rate fluctuations regarding cash flows between the state and the islands.

Aruba 
Aruba, with its own constitution, is a representative parliamentary democracy organised as a unitary state. Its administration consists of the Governor, who represents the Monarch, and the (Aruban) Council of Ministers, headed by a Prime Minister. The sovereign people of Aruba are represented by 21 parliamentarians in the Parliament of Aruba. The Governor of Aruba is Alfonso Boekhoudt, and the Prime Minister is Evelyn Wever-Croes. It has its own Central Bank and currency, the Aruban florin, linked to the U.S. dollar; the U.S. dollar is accepted almost everywhere on the island. Aruba has two official languages: its own national language Papiamento and the Kingdom of the Netherlands' Dutch language.

Curaçao 

Curaçao is a centralised unitary state, with similar administrative characteristics to Aruba. It has the Netherlands Antillean guilder as its currency.

Sint Maarten 
Sint Maarten is a centralised unitary state, with similar administrative characteristics to Aruba. It has the Antillean Guilder as its currency. Unlike the other Dutch Caribbean countries and special municipalities, Sint Maarten covers only part of an island. It consists of roughly the southern half of the divided island of Saint Martin. The northern half of the island is the French Collectivity of Saint Martin.

Institutions

Charter and constitutions 
Aruba, Curaçao, and Sint Maarten regulate the governance of their respective countries, but are subordinate to the Charter for the Kingdom of the Netherlands. The Netherlands is ruled by the provisions and institutions of the Constitution for the Kingdom of the Netherlands that also constitutes and regulates the institutions of the Kingdom that are mentioned in the Charter. The Constitution is also subordinate to the Charter. The provisions in the Charter for some of these institutions are additional and are applicable only for those affairs of the Kingdom, as described in the Charter, when they affect Aruba, Curaçao, or Sint Maarten directly. In cases where affairs of the Kingdom do not affect Aruba, Curaçao, or Sint Maarten, they are dealt with according to the provisions laid down in the Constitution. In these cases the Netherlands, the jurisdiction ruled directly by the Constitution for the Kingdom of the Netherlands, acts alone, according to its constitution and in its capacity as the Kingdom of the Netherlands. The other three countries cannot do the same for affairs of the Kingdom that only pertain to them and not to the Netherlands proper. In these cases, the provisions of the Charter prevail.

Changes in the Charter for the Kingdom of the Netherlands can only be made when all constituent countries agree.

Government 

The Monarch and the ministers he appoints form the Government of the Kingdom. According to Article 7 of the Charter, the Council of Ministers of the Kingdom of the Netherlands consists of the Council of Ministers of the Netherlands complemented by one Minister Plenipotentiary of Aruba, one Minister Plenipotentiary of Curaçao, and one Minister Plenipotentiary of Sint Maarten. The Dutch Prime Minister chairs the Council of Ministers of the Kingdom.

In December 2007, a Deputy Council for Kingdom Relations was established. This deputy council prepares the meetings of the Council of Ministers of the Kingdom. The establishment of such a Council has long been advocated by the Council of State of the Kingdom.

The Government and the Council of Ministers of the Kingdom, along with the monarchy itself, are subject to Article 5 of the Charter that refers their regulation mainly to the Constitution for the Kingdom of the Netherlands as far as the Charter for the Kingdom of the Netherlands does not provide for that.

Two legal instruments are available at the Kingdom level: the Kingdom act and the Order-in-Council for the Kingdom. An example of a Kingdom act is the "Kingdom Act regarding Dutch citizenship".

The Monarch of the Netherlands is the head of state of the Kingdom. The Monarch is represented in Aruba, Curaçao, and Sint Maarten by a governor.

Legislature 
The legislature of the Kingdom consists of the States General of the Netherlands and the Government. Articles 14, 16 and 17 of the Charter give some participation to the parliaments of the Aruba, Curaçao, and Sint Maarten.

Council of State 
Article 13 of the Charter specifies that there is a Council of State of the Kingdom. It is (as all institutions of the Kingdom) regulated in the Constitution, but the Charter implies that at the request of Aruba, Curaçao, or Sint Maarten, a member from each of these islands can be included in the Council of State. Aruba is currently exercising this right. This has not always been the case; the Netherlands Antilles had no member until 1987 and Aruba had none until 2000. Sint Maarten's first member of the Council of State will be former Lieutenant Governor Dennis Richardson.

Judiciary 
The Hoge Raad der Nederlanden is the supreme court of the Kingdom by virtue of the Cassation regulation for the Netherlands Antilles and Aruba. The basis for this regulation is article 23 of the Charter. The second paragraph of that article specifies that if an overseas country of the Kingdom so requests, the Kingdom Act should provide for an additional court member from that country. To date, neither Aruba, Curaçao, nor Sint Maarten has used this right.

According to Article 39 of the Charter, "civil and commercial law, the law of civil procedure, criminal law, the law of criminal procedure, copyright, industrial property, the office of notary, and provisions concerning weights and measures shall be regulated as far as possible in a similar manner in the Netherlands, Aruba, Curaçao and Sint Maarten". The Article further stipulates that when a drastic amendment of the existing legislation in regard to these matters is proposed, the proposal shall not be submitted to or considered by a representative assembly until the Governments in the other countries have had the opportunity to express their views on the matter.

Mutual arbitration between the constituent countries and the Kingdom 
In case of a conflict between a constituent country and the Kingdom, Article 12 of the Charter prescribes an administrative reconciliation procedure. This was often deemed a democratic deficit of the Kingdom, leading to the adoption of an amendment to the Charter, which entered into force on 10 October 2010. The new Article 12a specifies that in addition to the administrative reconciliation procedure, "by Kingdom Act measures shall be made allowing for the arbitration of certain conflicts, as specified by Kingdom Act, between the Kingdom and the countries." The imperative formulation was the result of an amendment in the Chamber of Representatives by special delegates Evelyna Wever-Croes and J.E. Thijsen of Aruba; the original formulation was "by Kingdom Act measures can be made".

The new Article 38a allows for measures to be made for arbitration between countries as well. In contrast with Article 12a, this article is not imperatively formulated.

Kingdom affairs 
Article 3 of the Charter specifies the Affairs of the Kingdom:
 Maintenance of the independence and the defence of the Kingdom;
 Foreign relations;
 Netherlands nationality;
 Regulation of the orders of chivalry, the flag and the coat of arms of the Kingdom;
 Regulation of the nationality of vessels and the standards required for the safety and navigation of seagoing vessels flying the flag of the Kingdom, with the exception of sailing ships;
 Supervision of the general rules governing the admission and expulsion of Netherlands nationals;
 General conditions for the admission and expulsion of aliens;
 Extradition.

One additional Kingdom affair is specified in article 43(2):
 The safeguarding of fundamental human rights and freedoms, legal certainty and good governance shall be a Kingdom affair.

Paragraph 2 of Article 3 specifies that "other matters may be declared to be Kingdom affairs in consultation".

These Kingdom affairs are only taken care of by the Council of Ministers of the Kingdom of the Netherlands, if the affair affects Aruba, Curaçao or St. Maarten. Article 14, paragraph 3, of the Charter, foresees the handling of Kingdom affairs in all other cases by the Netherlands.

On the basis of Article 38, the countries of the Kingdom can decide to adopt a Kingdom Act outside of the scope of the aforementioned Kingdom affairs. Such acts are referred to as Consensus Kingdom Acts, as they require the consent of the parliaments of Aruba, Curaçao and St. Maarten.

Foreign relations 
The Kingdom negotiates and concludes international treaties and agreements. Those that do not affect Aruba, Curaçao, or Sint Maarten directly are dealt with by the provisions of the Constitution (in fact by the Netherlands alone). Article 24 of the Charter specifies that when an international treaty or agreement affects Aruba, Curaçao, or Sint Maarten, the treaty or agreement concerned shall be submitted to their representative assemblies. The article further specifies that when such a treaty or agreement is submitted for the tacit approval of the States General of the Netherlands, the Ministers Plenipotentiary may communicate their wish that the treaty or agreement concerned shall be subject to the express approval of the States General.

Article 25 gives Aruba, Curaçao, and Sint Maarten the opportunity to opt out from an international treaty or agreement. The treaty or agreement concerned then has to specify that the treaty or agreement does not apply to Aruba, Curaçao, or Sint Maarten.

Article 26 specifies that when Aruba, Curaçao, or Sint Maarten communicate their wish for the conclusion of an international economic or financial agreement that applies solely to the country concerned, the Government of the Kingdom shall assist in the conclusion of such an agreement, unless this would be inconsistent with the country's ties with the Kingdom.

Article 27 specifies the involvement of Aruba, Curaçao, and Sint Maarten in the preparations for a treaty or agreement that affects them and Article 28 specifies that Aruba, Curaçao, or Sint Maarten may, if they so desire, accede to membership of international organisations.

Among other affiliations, the state is also a founding member of NATO, OECD and WTO.

Constitutional nature 
Most scholars agree that it is difficult to group the constitutional arrangements of the Kingdom in one of the traditional models of state organisation, and consider the Kingdom to be a  arrangement. Instead, the Kingdom is said to have characteristics of a federal state, a confederation, a federacy, and a devolved unitary state.

The Kingdom's federal characteristics include the delineation of Kingdom affairs in the Charter, the enumeration of the constituting parts of the Kingdom in the Charter, the fact that the Charter subordinates the law of the constituting countries to the law of the Kingdom, the establishment of Kingdom institutions in the Charter, and the fact that the Kingdom has its own legislative instruments: the Kingdom act and the Order-in-Council for the Kingdom.

Its confederal characteristics include the fact that the Charter can only be amended by consensus among the constituent countries.

Characteristics that point more or less to a federacy include the fact that the functioning of the institutions of the Kingdom is governed by the Constitution of the Netherlands where the Charter does not provide for them. The Charter also does not provide a procedure for the enactment of Kingdom acts; articles 81 to 88 of the Constitution of the Netherlands also apply for Kingdom acts, but with some additions and corrections stipulated in articles 15 to 22 of the Charter. The only Kingdom institution that requires the participation of the Caribbean countries in a mandatory way is the Council of Ministers of the Kingdom; both the Supreme Court and the Council of State of the Kingdom only include Caribbean members if one or more Caribbean countries ask for it, and the Caribbean countries are almost completely excluded from participating in the Kingdom's legislature. They can, however, participate in the drafting of a Kingdom act and their Ministers Plenipotentiary can oppose a Kingdom act otherwise supported by the Kingdom government in front of the Kingdom's parliament. Furthermore, according to article 15 of the Charter, the Ministers Plenipotentiary can request the Kingdom parliament to introduce a draft Kingdom act. Last, but not least, the Netherlands can, according to article 14 of the Charter, conduct Kingdom affairs on its own if conducting such affairs does not affect Aruba, Curaçao, or Sint Maarten. Aruba, Curaçao, and Sint Maarten do not have this right.

A characteristic that points to a devolved unitary state is the ability of the Kingdom government, according to article 50 of the Charter, to render a legislative or administrative measure of one of the Caribbean countries void if it is inconsistent with the Charter, an international agreement, a Kingdom act, an Order-in-Council for the Kingdom, or if it regulates an otherwise Kingdom affair.

The constitutional structure of the Kingdom is summarised by constitutional scholar C. Borman, in an often-cited definition, as follows:

Constitutional scholar C. A. J. M. Kortmann speaks of an "association of countries that has characteristics of a federation, yet one of its own kind." Belinfante and De Reede do speak about a "federal association" without any reservations.

Comparisons 

Despite being of a  constitutional nature, some other states have similar properties. In particular, the Kingdom of Denmark consists of Denmark, Greenland, and the Faroe Islands; the Realm of New Zealand consists of New Zealand, the Cook Islands, Niue, Tokelau, and the Ross Dependency. These comparisons are not exact; for instance, aside from the King of New Zealand, there is no constitutional structure shared between New Zealand, the Cook Islands, and Niue.

Other states also have multiple territories, but such territories are distinct. Some states, such as the United Kingdom and its overseas territories, as well as the United States and its insular areas, do not consider their external territories as integral parts of the state.

Other states, such as the Commonwealth of Australia, do treat their external territories as integral components, but have only one country/nationality level equivalent to the state.

Relationship with the European Union 
The Kingdom of the Netherlands is a founding member state of the European Union. Although originally both Suriname and the Netherlands Antilles were explicitly excluded from association with the European Economic Community by means of a special protocol attached to the Treaty of Rome, the status of Suriname as an overseas country (OCT) of the Community was established by a Supplementary Act completing the instrument of ratification of the Kingdom of the Netherlands on 1 September 1962. The Convention on the association of the Netherlands Antilles with the European Economic Community entered into force on 1 October 1964, signalling the attainment of OCT status by the Netherlands Antilles. Suriname is now an independent republic and a sovereign country, outside the EU. The Antilles have been dissolved.

The Caribbean islands, including the BES islands that are part of the Netherlands proper, are OCTs. Since citizenship is a Kingdom affair, and is thus not distinguished for the four countries, citizens from all four countries are also citizens of the European Union. However, these territories are not part of the European Union.

Constitutional reform of the Netherlands Antilles 

In 2004, a joint commission proposed major reforms for the Netherlands Antilles. On 11 October and 2 November 2006, agreements were signed between the Dutch government and the governments of each island that would put into effect the commission's findings by 15 December 2008. The reform took effect on 10 October 2010. Under these reforms, the Netherlands Antilles were dissolved and Curaçao and Sint Maarten became constituent countries within the Kingdom of the Netherlands, obtaining the same status as Aruba which seceded from the Netherlands Antilles in 1986.

The BES islands (i.e., Bonaire, Saba, and Sint Eustatius) became direct parts of the Netherlands, which is itself the major constituent country of the Kingdom. As special municipalities, they were constituted as "public bodies" under the Constitution for the Kingdom of the Netherlands. These municipalities resemble ordinary Dutch municipalities in most ways (e.g., they have mayors, aldermen, and municipal councils) and the laws of the Netherlands would operate in them. As a transitional measure, however, only Netherlands law necessary to function within its legal system took immediate effect when the BES islands joined the Netherlands on 10 October 2010, while most laws of the Netherlands Antilles remained in force. Since that date, Dutch legislation slowly replaced Netherlands Antilles laws. Nevertheless, some derogations exist: e.g., social security is not at the same level as in the European part of the Netherlands, and the islands' currency is the U.S. dollar, not the euro.

The special municipalities will be represented in the affairs of the Kingdom by the Netherlands, as they vote for the Dutch parliament. The Dutch Senate is chosen by provincial councils; however, as the BES islands are not part of any province, each elects an electoral college who then choose the Senators similarly to the provincial councils.

The Netherlands has proposed to conducted a study on the BES islands acquiring the European Union status of Outermost Regions (OMR), also called Ultra Peripheral Regions (UPR). The study would also look into how the islands would fare under UPR status.

Distinction between the Netherlands and the Kingdom 
Outside the Kingdom of the Netherlands, "Netherlands" is used as the English short-form name to describe the Kingdom of the Netherlands. At the United Nations, for example, the Kingdom was, until 2023, identified in the General Assembly by its English short-form name "Netherlands", whereas the English long-form name "Kingdom of the Netherlands" was used in place of the name "Netherlands" in formal UN documentation. In 2023, at the request of the Dutch government, the UN adopted "Kingdom of the Netherlands" as the official short form, which in alphabetical lists appears as "Netherlands (Kingdom of the)". The new form appears in the terminology database of the United Nations: https://unterm.un.org/unterm2/en/view/089a6443-0bba-4dd2-bc8d-a4888bb508b8. International treaties, also, frequently shorten "Kingdom of the Netherlands" to "Netherlands". The Dutch name that is commonly used is Nederland, which is a singular form, whereas the official Dutch name Koninkrijk der Nederlanden like the English "(Kingdom of the) Netherlands", uses the plural form. In Dutch practice, however, "Kingdom of the Netherlands" is shortened to "Kingdom" and not to "Netherlands", as the latter name could be confused with the Kingdom's principal constituent country rather than with the Kingdom in its Charter capacity. The Charter for the Kingdom of the Netherlands also shortens "Kingdom of the Netherlands" to "Kingdom" rather than to "Netherlands".

Apart from the fact that referring to the Kingdom of the Netherlands as the "Netherlands" can be confusing, the term "Kingdom" is also used to prevent any feelings of ill will that could be associated with the use of the term "Netherlands." The use of the term "Netherlands" for the Kingdom as a whole might imply that Aruba, Curaçao, and Sint Maarten are not equal to the Kingdom's country in Europe and that the three island countries have no say in affairs pertaining to the Kingdom but are instead subordinate to the European country. Though the influence of the islands in Kingdom affairs is limited, it certainly exists.

Talking about the negotiation tactics of then Minister for Kingdom Affairs Alexander Pechtold, ChristenUnie leader, and then demissionary Deputy Prime Minister of the Netherlands André Rouvoet illustrated the sensitivity in this matter by remarking in the House of Representatives that "[...] the old reproof that constantly characterised the relationship between the Netherlands and the Antilles immediately surfaced again. The Netherlands identifies the Kingdom with the Netherlands and dictates. The Netherlands Antilles can like it or lump it." In addition, the Werkgroep Bestuurlijke en Financiële Verhoudingen Nederlandse Antillen—the commission that explored the current constitutional reform of the Kingdom—recommended that the "identification of the Netherlands with the Kingdom needs to be eliminated". The Council of State of the Kingdom joins the commission in this by remarking that the Kingdom of the Netherlands has no telephone number, no budget and that the Council of Ministers of the Kingdom usually meets very briefly with a summary agenda. To counter this habit, the Council of State has suggested that with the pending constitutional reform in the Kingdom, a Secretariat for the Kingdom will be instituted that prepares the agenda for the Council of Ministers of the Kingdom and guards the enforcement of decisions of the council.

Geography 

The Kingdom of the Netherlands has land borders with Belgium, Germany (both in the European Netherlands), and France (on Saint Martin).

About one quarter of the Netherlands lies below sea level, as much land has been reclaimed from the sea. Dikes were erected to protect the land from flooding. Previously, the highest point of the Netherlands was the Vaalserberg in Limburg at only , but with the constitutional reform of 10 October 2010 this changed as Saba became part of the Netherlands as a special municipality, and its Mount Scenery took the place of the Vaalserberg.

The Caribbean parts of the Kingdom consist of two zones with different geographic origins. The Leeward Islands (Saba, Sint Eustatius and Sint Maarten) are all of volcanic origin and hilly, leaving little ground suitable for agriculture. The Leeward Antilles (Aruba, Bonaire and Curaçao) are largely lacking in volcanic activity: the island arc occurs along the deformed southern edge of the Caribbean Plate and was formed by the plate's subduction under the South American Plate.

The Caribbean islands have a tropical climate, with warm weather all year round. The Leeward Islands are subject to hurricanes in the summer months. The European part of the Netherlands has a moderate maritime climate, with cool summers and mild winters.

Timeline of constituent countries

See also 
 Dutch Caribbean
 Federacy
 Koninkrijksdag
 Personal union
 Monarchy of the Netherlands
 British West Indies Federation (1958–1962), made up of 10 provinces of the UK

Notes

References

External links 

 Official English website of the government of the Netherlands
 Official Dutch website of the government of the Netherlands
 Official website of the government of Aruba
 Official  website of the government of Curaçao
 Official website of the government of Sint Maarten
 Official website of the Royal Family

 
States and territories established in 1815
Member states of NATO
Member states of the European Union
1815 establishments in the Netherlands
Transcontinental countries
Member states of the Dutch Language Union
Member states of the United Nations
Member states of the Union for the Mediterranean